Metamorphosed is the twenty-fourth studio album by American garage rock band Osees, released on October 16, 2020, by Rock Is Hell Records. The album is a mix of songs recorded for the band's 2019 album Face Stabber as well as jam sessions recorded in Mexico during the subsequent tour. It is the second of three full-length albums released by the band in 2020.

Background and release
Metamorphosed was one of two albums announced on the release day of the band's prior album Protean Threat, along with remix-album Panther Rotate. The album's A-side contains short tracks originally recorded for the band's 2019 release Face Stabber, while the B-side contains two extended jam tracks that were recorded in Hermosillo, Mexico. Additional vocals and instrumentation for the B-side tracks were completed at John Dwyer's home studio, Stu Stu Studio.

Track listing

Personnel
Credits adapted from the vinyl record sleeve.

Osees
John Dwyer – also recording, mixing
Tim Hellman 
Tomas Dolas 
Dan Rincon 
Paul Quattrone 

Additional musicians
Caleb Michel – conga

Technical personnel
Dylan Marcus McConnell – artwork
Enrique Tena Padilla – recording, mixing
Mario Ramirez – recording
Eric Bauer – recording
Felipe Garcia – recording
JJ Golden – mastering
Matthew Jones – layout

References

2020 albums
Oh Sees albums